The Legislative Council of the Province of Canada was the upper house for the Province of Canada, which consisted of the former provinces of Lower Canada, then known as Canada East and later the province of Quebec, and Upper Canada, then known as Canada West and later the province of Ontario. It was created by The Union Act of 1840. With the lower house, the Legislative Assembly of the Province of Canada, the two houses constituted the Parliament of the Province of Canada.

The first session of parliament began in Kingston in Canada West in 1841. It succeeded the Legislative Council of Lower Canada and Legislative Council of Upper Canada.

The 24 legislative councillors were originally appointed for life. In 1854, the British Parliament authorized their election, and implementing legislation was passed by the Province of Canada in 1856. It was provided that:

 The present appointed councillors would continue to hold their positions until they had vacated them.
 Members were to be elected for eight-year terms from each of 48 divisions (24 in each of Canada East and Canada West).
 The order in which divisions were to be selected for elections was to be determined by lot.
 12 members were elected every two years from 1856 to 1862.

The British North America Act of 1867 divided the Province of Canada into the provinces of Ontario and Quebec, each with representation in the unelected Senate of Canada. As a province, Ontario never created a Legislative Council; however, Quebec had its own Legislative Council until 1968. Both the provincial and federal upper houses used (and, in the case of the Senate, continues to use to the present day) the same 24 divisions for Quebec as had been used for Canada East by the Legislative Council of the Province of Canada prior to Confederation.

List of legislative councillors 
 = died in office
 = elected in byelection
 = resigned from office
 = elected by acclamation
 = unseated

Speakers of the Legislative Council
The Speaker was the presiding officer of the Legislative Council, and was appointed by the Queen-in-Council. He was styled "The Honourable, the Vice-Chancellor, Speaker."

The office was preceded by the Speaker of Legislative Council of Upper Canada and Speaker of the Legislative Council of Lower Canada. The following table displays the names and political parties of the Speakers between 1841 and 1866.

Parliament Buildings

The Legislative Council and Legislative Assembly of the Province of Canada sat a various buildings in Toronto, Kingston, Montreal, Quebec City and Ottawa:

 1841-1843 three sessions were held at the 3 storey Kingston General Hospital
 1843 Parliament moves to Montreal and sites at renovated St. Anne's Market; burned down in 1849; rebuilt as market only and burned down again in 1902; site later as parking lot and now public square called Place d'Youville.
 1849 temporary sites for Parliament at Bonsecours Market and the Freemason's Hall, Montreal for single session.
 1849-1850 Parliament returns to Toronto to the site of the Third Parliament Buildings at Front and Simcoe Street.
 1851 Parliament relocates to Quebec City in 1851 to the Quebec Parliament Building until fire in destroys the building in 1854.
 1854-1859 Parliament remains in Quebec and relocates to Quebec Music Hall and Quebec City Courthouse.
 1859 Parliament return to Toronto to the site of the last parliament held there in 1849-1851 sessions.
 1860-1865 Parliament returns to Quebec and new Parliament Buildings, Quebec at Parc Montmercy; re-used as Parliament of Quebec 1867-1883
 1866-1867 Parliament locates in Ottawa on Parliament Hill to the completed and original Centre Block, as well as the East and West Block; Centre Block was later destroyed by fire

See also
 List of by-elections to the Legislative Council of the Province of Canada

References

External links 
  Assemblée nationale du Québec (French)
The Canadian parliamentary companion : first year, HJ Morgan (1862)
The Canadian parliamentary companion, HJ Morgan (1867)

Political history of Canada
Province of Canada
Defunct upper houses in Canada

1841 establishments in Canada